Aleksandar Sarić (Serbian Cyrillic: Александар Сарић; born 27 January 1974) is a goalkeeper coach of the Serbian U20 team who become World Champion on New Zealand 2015 and a retired Serbian footballer who played as a goalkeeper.

Club career
In an 18-year professional career, Sarić played for clubs in Serbia, Germany, Portugal, Israel, Romania, Austria and Slovakia. He played top division football with FK Beograd, FK Obilić, Hapoel Jerusalem F.C. – where he was voted the best goalkeeper in the Israeli Premier League – Maccabi Petah Tikva F.C., FK Železnik, FC Politehnica Timișoara, SK Austria Kärnten, FK DAC 1904 Dunajská Streda and FK Čukarički.

After he finished his career as an active player in 2010 Serbian SuperLiga, at the age of 37, he worked as a coach for FK Beograd and the national Serbian youth teams (U-15, U-17, and U-19). He is the owner and founder of the "B1" goalkeeper school in Belgrade.

Coaching career
As a goalkeeper coach Saric has worked in those senior teams:

 SC Varzim
 FC Austria Lustenau
 FC Dunajska Streda
 FC Beograd
 FC Arema Malang
Chicago Fire SC

and in Serbian National youth teams U15, U16, U17, U18, U19 and U20

In 2015 with Serbian U20 national team Saric become a World champion at New Zealand as a GK coach and assistant in the staff. Since 2015 he has worked as an assistant and GK coach in MLS league for Chicago Fire.
 
Half finalist of U20 European championship in Hungary as a goalkeeper coach and member of the staff of Serbian squad
In Hungary as a member of the staff and  GK coach on European championship

Education
Master manager of training technology Alfa University Belgrade 

Bachelor of sport science, Trainer in Football, University of Sport Belgrade

UEFA A licence

Spanish football federation Goalkeeper coach licence

Austrian Goalkeeper coach licence

References

External links
 Official blog
 
 
 U20 World Champion 2015 at New Zealand as a goalkeeper coach and member of the staff of Serbian squad.

1974 births
Living people
Footballers from Belgrade
Serbian footballers
Serbian expatriate footballers
Association football goalkeepers
Serbian SuperLiga players
Red Star Belgrade footballers
FK Spartak Subotica players
FK Obilić players
FK Železnik players
FK Čukarički players
FC Carl Zeiss Jena players
C.F. União players
Varzim S.C. players
Hapoel Jerusalem F.C. players
Maccabi Petah Tikva F.C. players
Liga I players
Israeli Premier League players
FC Politehnica Timișoara players
FC Kärnten players
FC DAC 1904 Dunajská Streda players
2. Bundesliga players
Expatriate footballers in Germany
Serbian expatriate sportspeople in Germany
Expatriate footballers in Portugal
Serbian expatriate sportspeople in Portugal
Expatriate footballers in Israel
Serbian expatriate sportspeople in Israel
Expatriate footballers in Romania
Serbian expatriate sportspeople in Romania
Expatriate footballers in Austria
Serbian expatriate sportspeople in Austria
Expatriate footballers in Slovakia
Serbian expatriate sportspeople in Slovakia
Chicago Fire FC non-playing staff